Robin Le Normand (born 11 November 1996) is a French professional footballer who plays as a centre-back for La Liga club Real Sociedad.

Formed at Brest, where he made one first-team appearance, he spent several years in La Liga with Real Sociedad, where he won the 2020 Copa del Rey.

Club career

Brest
Born in Pabu, Côtes-d'Armor, Brittany Le Normand represented Brest as a youth player. On 21 September 2013 he made his senior debut, starting with the reserve team in a 1–0 CFA 2 away loss against Lannion.

Le Normand scored his first senior goal on 19 March 2016, netting his team's third in a 3–3 draw at Fougères. On 15 April, he made his professional debut by starting in a 2–1 away loss against Sochaux for the Ligue 2.

Real Sociedad
On 5 July 2016, Le Normand signed a two-year deal with Real Sociedad, being assigned to the B-team in Segunda División B. He received a new contract in August 2018, for two more years.

Le Normand made his first team – and La Liga – debut on 26 November 2018, starting in a 2–1 home win against Celta Vigo. The following 12 February, he renewed his contract with the Txuri-urdin until 2022,  and was definitely promoted to the main squad on 9 June. 

After the departure of Héctor Moreno, Le Normand became an integral part of the starting XI. He scored his first La Liga goal on 30 November 2019, opening the scoring in a 4–1 home win against Eibar. He was rewarded with a contract extension until 2024 on 4 June 2020. 

On 19 December 2019, Le Normand scored in an 8–0 win at Tercera División club Becerril in the first round of the Copa del Rey; he also played in the 1–0 win over Basque derby rivals Athletic Bilbao in the COVID-delayed final on 3 April 2021. He was chosen as La Liga Player of the Month for October 2021.

Personal life
Le Normand's younger brother, Théo, is also a professional footballer, who made his debut for Guingamp in 2021.

Career statistics

Club

Honours 
Real Sociedad
 Copa del Rey: 2019–20

Individual
 La Liga Player of the Month: October 2021

References

External links 
 Profile at the Real Sociedad website
 
 
 
 

1996 births
Living people
Sportspeople from Côtes-d'Armor
Footballers from Brittany
French footballers
Association football defenders
Stade Brestois 29 players
Real Sociedad B footballers
Real Sociedad footballers
Ligue 2 players
Segunda División B players
La Liga players
French expatriate footballers
Expatriate footballers in Spain
French expatriate sportspeople in Spain